A Massachusetts general election was held on November 6, 1962, in the Commonwealth of Massachusetts.

The election included:
 statewide elections for United States Senator, Governor, Lieutenant Governor, Attorney General, Secretary of the Commonwealth, Treasurer, and Auditor;
 district elections for U.S. Representatives, State Representatives, State Senators, and Governor's Councillors; and
 ballot questions at the state and local levels.

Democratic and Republican candidates were selected in party primaries held on September 18, 1962.

Governor

Democrat Endicott Peabody was elected over Republican incumbent John A. Volpe, Socialist Labor candidate Henning A. Blomen, and Prohibition candidate Guy S. Williams.

Lieutenant Governor 

Democrat Francis X. Belotti was elected Lieutenant Governor over Republican Francis W. Perry, Socialist Labor candidate Francis A. Votano, and Prohibition candidate Gaetano T. Maratea.

Republican primary

Candidates
Francis W. Perry, State Representative from Duxbury

Results
Perry was unopposed for the Republican nomination.

Democratic primary

Candidates
Francis X. Bellotti, attorney and candidate for Norfolk County District Attorney in 1958
Herbert L. Connolly, auto dealer

Disqualified
Pasquale Caggiano, perennial candidate

Declined
Edward F. McLaughlin Jr., incumbent Lt. Governor (to run for Governor))

Results

General election

Results

Attorney General

Incumbent Attorney General Edward J. McCormack, Jr. did not run for re-election. Republican Edward Brooke defeated Democrat Francis E. Kelly to win the open race. Brooke became the first elected African-American Attorney General of any state in American history.

Democratic primary

Candidates 
 Francis E. Kelly, former Lieutenant Governor and Attorney General
 James R. Lawton, State Representative from Brockton
 Thomas L. McCormack
 Margaret McGovern, attorney and candidate for Secretary of the Commonwealth in 1960
 Matthew G. McGrath, Jr.

Results

Republican primary

Candidates 
 Edward Brooke, Chairman of the Boston Finance Commission and nominee for Secretary of the Commonwealth in 1960
 Elliot Richardson, former U.S. Attorney for the District of Massachusetts

Results

General election 
In the general election, Brooke defeated Kelly, Socialist Workers candidate Edgar E. Gaudet, and Prohibition candidate Howard B. Rand.

Secretary of the Commonwealth

Incumbent Secretary of the Commonwealth Kevin White, defeated Republican Harris Reynolds, Socialist Labor candidate John Erlandson, and Prohibition candidate Julia Kohler in the general election.

General election

Results

Treasurer and Receiver-General

Democratic primary

Candidates
John T. Driscoll, incumbent Treasurer and Receiver-General
John Francis Kennedy, former Treasurer and Receiver-General (1957–61) and candidate for Governor in 1960
John M. Kennedy

Results

Republican primary

Candidates
Joseph B. Grossman, businessman and former State Representative
Francis Andrew Walsh

Results

General election

Results

Auditor

Incumbent Auditor Thomas J. Buckley defeated Republican Phillip M. Walsh, Socialist Labor candidate Ethelbert Nevens, and Prohibition candidate Louise Metays in the general election.

United States Senator

Democrat Ted Kennedy was elected over Republican George C. Lodge, Independent H. Stuart Hughes, Socialist Labor candidate Lawrence Gilfedder, and Prohibition candidate Mark R. Shaw in a special election to fill the unexpired term of John F. Kennedy, who was elected President of the United States.

References

 
Massachusetts